The Communauté de communes de la Région d'Hallencourt  is a former communauté de communes in the Somme département and in the  Picardie région of France. It was created in December 1995. It was merged into the new Communauté d'agglomération Baie de Somme in January 2017.

Composition 
This Communauté de communes comprised 18 communes:

Allery
Bailleul 
Bettencourt-Rivière
Citerne 
Condé-Folie
Doudelainville
Érondelle
Fontaine-sur-Somme
Frucourt
Hallencourt
Huppy
Liercourt
Limeux
Longpré-les-Corps-Saints
Mérélessart
Sorel-en-Vimeu
Vaux-Marquenneville
Wiry-au-Mont

See also 
Communes of the Somme department

References

External links 
"Les années de guerre" de la Section Patrimoine CIS N°14 de la Cté de Cme d'Hallencourt  .

Hallencourt